The Slovakia national women's field hockey team represents Slovakia in international field hockey tournaments for women. Before 2019 they were not ranked at the FIH World Rankings, because they had been inactive for several years. They generally compete in the lowest tier of the European championships, the Women's EuroHockey Championship III and have never qualified for a world cup nor the Olympics.

Tournament record

See also
Slovakia men's national field hockey team

References

External links
FIH profile

Field hockey
European women's national field hockey teams
National team